Caroline Kamusiime  (born 23 November 1982) is a Ugandan female legislator representing the people of Rukiga district as district woman member of parliament of Uganda. She is a member of the National Resistance Movement (NRM) the party in political leadership in Uganda under the chairmanship of Yoweri Kaguta Museveni president of the republic of Uganda.

Kamusiime has been part of efforts to finding a solution for the feud and cold relations between Rwanda and Uganda, where Rwanda closed its borders to Uganda accusing Uganda of funding elements that want to bring down the Rwandan regime.

In 2021, she was re elected as member of parliament.

Education 
Kamusiime undertook her O'level education from kololo high school where she sat her Uganda certificate of education (UCE) in 1997. She later enrolled at bishop comboni college kanungu where she completed her Uganda advanced certificate of  education (UACE) in 1999. She later received a bachelor's degree in information technology from Makerere university in 2010.

Career 
Kamusiime has been member of parliament of Uganda from 2017 to date.

She was information technology officer at MTN Uganda from 2011 to 2016,

She was also a front desk officer at British American tobacco Uganda from 2006 to 2010 and was an accountant for caltex Uganda from 2000 to 2006

In the Uganda parliament, she serves on the legal and parliamentary affairs committee

References 

National Resistance Movement politicians
1982 births
Women members of the Parliament of Uganda
Members of the Parliament of Uganda
Makerere University alumni
Living people
21st-century Ugandan politicians
21st-century Ugandan women politicians